Buluka is a genus of braconid wasps in the family Braconidae. There are about 11 described species in Buluka, found in Indomalaya, Africa, and China.

Species
These 11 species belong to the genus Buluka:
 Buluka achterbergi Austin, 1989
 Buluka collessi Austin & Dangerfield, 1992
 Buluka horni Gupta, 2013
 Buluka huddlestoni Austin, 1989
 Buluka noyesi Austin, 1989
 Buluka orientalis Chou, 1985
 Buluka quickei Ranjith, 2015
 Buluka straeleni de Saeger, 1948
 Buluka taiwanensis Austin, 1989
 Buluka townesi Austin, 1989
 Buluka vuquangensis Long, 2015

References

Microgastrinae